Honoo-no Taiiku-kai TV is a Japanese gameshow where members of the public challenge sports professionals such as Ronda Rousey and Cris Cyborg.

Cast

MC

Ameagari Kesshitai

Assistant (TBS Announcer)
 October 2011 – March 2015
 
 April 2015 – 2016

Play-to-play (Announcer)

 (Freelance announcer)

References

2011 Japanese television series debuts
TBS Television (Japan) original programming
Japanese game shows

2023 Japanese television series endings